Joes Fork is a  long 2nd order tributary to Nicks Creek in Moore County, North Carolina.

Course
Joes Fork rises on the Deep Creek divide about 1.5 miles west of Taylortown in Moore County, North Carolina.  Joes Fork then flows northeast to meet Nicks Creek about 2 miles north of Pinehurst.

Watershed
Joes Fork drains  of area, receives about 49.7 in/year of precipitation, has a topographic wetness index of 445.60 and is about 28% forested.

References

Rivers of North Carolina
Rivers of Moore County, North Carolina